Azazel is a supervillain appearing in American comic books published by Marvel Comics. Created by Chuck Austen and Sean Philips, the character first appeared in Uncanny X-Men #428 (August 2003). He belongs to the subspecies of humans named mutants, who are born with superhuman abilities, and to the species of humanoid magical beings named demons, who are born with supernatural powers. He is the father of the X-Men's Kiwi Black and Nightcrawler.

Jason Flemyng played the character in the film X-Men: First Class.

Publication history 
Azazel's first appearance was in Uncanny X-Men #428 (August 2003) during "The Draco" storyline, written by Chuck Austen. The character's name comes from Azazel, an angel from the Book of Enoch mentioned first at chapter 8 verse 1. His origin story was presented in The Uncanny X-Men #433 (2004).

Fictional character biography 
Azazel is said to be one of the oldest mutants, belonging to an ancient group of demonic-looking mutants called the Neyaphem. He states that he once rivaled Mephisto for the title of "Satan." Eventually, the Neyaphem were banished to the Brimstone Dimension by another group of angelic-looking mutants known as the Cheyarafim. Azazel is seen to be convinced that Warren Worthington III was one of the members of the group. Azazel has been known to make demonic deals with humans, including the family of Monet St. Croix.

Modern Age 
The leader of the Neyaphem, Azazel, is the only one who is able to breach the dimensional void and return to Earth for brief periods of time due to his teleportation powers. His only hope to return to Earth permanently is to impregnate women, as his children are linked to his dimension and he can use them to create a stable gateway between dimensions. Azazel begins mating with women who have strange appearances, at least with looks and abilities other women didn't have. He meets Mystique in Germany, when she is married to a rich castle lord named Baron Christian Wagner. With Christian unable to give her children, Mystique is introduced to Azazel, whom Christian knew as a business partner. Mystique had secretly been taking lovers to produce an heir to Count Wagner. Mystique falls in love with Azazel and becomes pregnant with Nightcrawler. While she is at first hesitant to betray Christian because of their marriage, she kills Christian after he suspects her betrayal. Mystique leaves to look for Azazel, who is nowhere to be found. It is later shown that Azazel was taking care of business involving the Cheyarafim, and had to leave, knowing that Mystique would find some way to live. However, she doesn't have much time to formulate a plan, as the angry villagers soon find out about Christian's murder and come after her and the demonic-looking baby. In order to save her own life, she shape-shifts into one of the villagers and drops Nightcrawler over the cliff, saying that she had pushed herself off as well. With her own life saved, she runs away. Mystique is the only woman that Azazel sought to have relations with besides simple procreation. Later, thinking Mystique to be dead, Azazel sires several dozen other children.

Brimstone Dimension Opening 
Azazel's other children are all mysteriously called to gather and sacrifice themselves on the island known as the Isla Des Demonas to open a portal and bring his army to Earth, with the goal of destroying both the Cheyarafim and what Azazel calls "normal mutants", mutants whose bodies do not show signs of their mutation, and who are not seen as monsters and demons. In addition to Nightcrawler, another son of Azazel's is the Genoshan called Abyss. The children of Azazel all join each other in a zombie-like state and open a portal to his dimension. A group of X-Men had followed Kurt to see where he was going, and jump into the portal once it opens. Once inside, Azazel takes great pleasure in toying with the team, having them believe that he is actually Satan. In the end, the X-Men defeat Azazel and his army and banish him to an unknown oblivion. The X-Men, including Nightcrawler, are able to escape, along with two other children of Azazel: Abyss and Kiwi Black.

Return 
Azazel's whereabouts are unknown for several years, but he resurfaces in this dimension, accompanied by a few Azazel-like Bamfs, revealing himself to be the master of Calcabrina, former ally of Frankenstein's Monster, and banned from all realms of Hell.

Weapon X-Force 
Confronted by a shape-shifted Mystique, a disguise he easily sees through, Azazel is asked to join Mystique to the realm of Hell to fight the newly resurrected William Stryker, who has become demonic. Weapon X-Force is close in perimeter, and Sabertooth grows agitated with the lack of progression towards the mission's goal, eventually having the team reveal themselves to attack Azazel, with the plan to force teleport them to the realm of Hell Stryker resides in. Azazel quickly overpowers the team and obliges the request because of the ties Mystique has with Sabertooth. In order to send them to Hell, the Weapon X-Force are killed by Azazel, as they are sinners designated for eternal damnation prior. Due to Weapon X-Force's regenerative healing, Azazel keeps the team in suspended animation with the use of his teleportation abilities. Frozen in time, the team's souls are able to be transported to Hell to complete the mission and Azazel is to unfreeze them to return them to their individual bodies once they are revived with their healing factors.

House of X 
Azazel is eventually welcomed to the new mutant island of Krakoa, created by Xavier, Magneto, and Moira X. He enters through the teleportation gateway alongside other villainous and fractious mutants, who are invited to join the nation in order to heal mutantdom and start over as a whole species together.

Powers and abilities 
Azazel is an immortal mutant. He is able to transport himself and others through great distances. He is able to project bolts of paralyzing energy, manipulate the mind of others, and change his appearance. Azazel can also cast magic spells.

Reception

Critical reception 
Andre Young of WhatCulture ranked Azazel 10th in their "10 Most Evil X-Men Villains" list. CBR.com ranked Azazel 7th in their "10 Most Powerful Comic Book Villains With Demonic Origins" list, 9th in their "X-Men: The 5 Deadliest Members Of The Hellfire Club (& The 5 Weakest)" list, and 29th in their "Age Of Apocalypse: The 30 Strongest Characters In Marvel's Coolest Alternate World" list.

Other versions

Age of Apocalypse 
In the "Age of Apocalypse" reality, Azazel first appears as a member of the Clan Akkaba. Weapon Omega appoints Azazel his Minister of Death and makes him his right-hand man.

Marvel Zombies 
In the patchwork planet known as Battle world that debuted in Secret Wars, a zombified version of Azazel is shown to exist in the Deadlands, a Battle world domain outside God Emperor Doom's jurisdiction that represents the remnants of Earth-2149 and goes by the name of Red Terror.

In other media

Film 
 Azazel appears in X-Men: First Class, portrayed by Jason Flemyng. Similarly to his comics counterpart, this version is a member of the Hellfire Club of Russian origin who wields a sword and works as an assistant to the group's leader, Sebastian Shaw. Throughout the film, Azazel assists Shaw in instigating the Cuban Missile Crisis in the hopes of starting World War III. However, they are foiled by Charles Xavier and Erik Lehnsherr's fledgling X-Men. After Lehnsherr kills Shaw, Azazel and the remaining Hellfire Club members defect to him.
 As of X-Men: Days of Future Past and its accompanying viral marketing campaign, it is revealed that Azazel was among several mutants who were captured, experimented on, and killed by Bolivar Trask and Project Wideawake. Additionally, according to screenplay writer Simon Kinberg, Azazel was the father of Mystique.

References

External links
 Azazel at Marvel.com
 Uncannyxmen.net Character Profile on Azazel
 

Characters created by Chuck Austen
Comics characters introduced in 2003
Fictional characters with immortality
Fictional murderers
Fictional Russian people
Fictional swordfighters in comics
Marvel Comics characters who are shapeshifters
Marvel Comics characters who can teleport
Marvel Comics characters who have mental powers
Marvel Comics characters with accelerated healing
Marvel Comics demons
Marvel Comics film characters
Marvel Comics mutants
Marvel Comics telepaths
Marvel Comics male supervillains
Marvel Comics supervillains
Fiction about purgatory